Lake Frontenac was a proglacial lake in the basin of what is now Lake Ontario.
The sudden influx of fresh water into the Atlantic, as the retreat of the Laurentian Glacier triggered a sudden drop in the lake's water level, may in turn have triggered the onset of the Younger Dryas, 1000-year period of renewed cooling approximately 12000 years ago.

When the retreating ice opened a passage eastward around the north side of the Adirondack Mountains to the basin of Lake Champlain, the lake level fell and the outlet at Rome was abandoned. At this stage the ice barrier or dam rested about on the Frontenac axis of the pre-Cambrian rocks and the lake may therefore be called Lake Frontenac.

See also
Glacial Lake Iroquois
Admiralty Lake

References

Proglacial lakes
Geology of New York (state)
Glacial lakes of Canada